The 1969 VFL Grand Final was an Australian rules football game contested between the Carlton Football Club and Richmond Football Club, held at the Melbourne Cricket Ground in Melbourne on 27 September 1969. It was the 72nd annual Grand Final of the Victorian Football League, staged to determine the premiers for the 1969 VFL season. The match, attended by 119,165 spectators, was won by Richmond by a margin of 25 points, marking that club's seventh VFL/AFL premiership victory.

Richmond had only qualified for the finals on percentage and were underdogs coming into the game, with Carlton being the reigning premiers.

The game's attendance of 119,165 represented the most spectators to have witnessed a premiership decider in VFL Grand Final history, breaking the record of 116,828 spectators who witnessed the 1968 VFL Grand Final. The record was subsequently broken again in the 1970 VFL Grand Final.

Teams

{|
|valign="top"|

Summary

References
 The Official statistical history of the AFL 2004 
 Ross, J. (ed), 100 Years of Australian Football 1897-1996: The Complete Story of the AFL, All the Big Stories, All the Great Pictures, All the Champions, Every AFL Season Reported, Viking, (Ringwood), 1996. 
 Lovett, Michael: AFL Record: Guide to Season 2007, AFL Publishing, 2007.

See also
 1969 VFL season

VFL/AFL Grand Finals
VFL Grand Final
Richmond Football Club
Carlton Football Club